Joseph Frank Hoover (August 8, 1932 – April 19, 2018) was an American film actor.

Roles include the young reporter in The Man Who Shot Liberty Valance, Captain Loomis in Hell Is for Heroes, and Lieutenant Blanchard in the 1966 remake of Stagecoach.

Filmography

References

External links 

1932 births
2018 deaths
American male film actors
American male television actors
Place of birth missing